Universum is a peer-reviewed academic journal specialising in social sciences and humanities of Latin America. It is published by the Instituto de Estudios Humanísticos Abate Juan Ignacio Molina (University of Talca) and is also financed by the university with the sponsorship of local companies. The editor-in-chief is Francisco Javier Pinedo (University of Talca).

External links 
 

Academic journals published by universities of Chile
Biannual journals
Multidisciplinary social science journals
Spanish-language journals
University of Talca
Multidisciplinary humanities journals
Publications established in 1986
1986 establishments in Chile
Open access journals